05/03 is the debut live EP by English rock and blues band 22-20s. The EP was recorded in May 2003 and released on September 30, 2003.

Track listing

References

2003 debut EPs
22-20s EPs
22-20s live albums
Live EPs
2003 live albums
Astralwerks EPs
Astralwerks live albums
Heavenly Recordings live albums
Heavenly Recordings EPs